Bradbury & Evans (est.1830) was an English printing and publishing business founded by William Bradbury (1799–1869) and Frederick Mullett Evans (1804–1870) in London.

History
For the first ten years Bradbury & Evans were printers, then added publishing in 1841 after they purchased Punch magazine. As printers they did work for Joseph Paxton, Edward Moxon and Chapman and Hall (publishers of Charles Dickens). Dickens left Chapman and Hall in 1844 and Bradbury and Evans became his new publisher. Bradbury and Evans published William Makepeace Thackeray's Vanity Fair in 1847 (as a serial), as well as most of his longer fiction. The firm operated from offices at no.11 Bouverie Street, no.85 Fleet Street, and no.4-14 Lombard Street, London (now Lombard Lane).

The inclusion of a monthly supplement, Household Narrative, in the weekly Household Words edited by Dickens was the occasion for a test case on newspaper taxation in 1851. Bradbury & Evans as publishers might have found themselves in the forefront of the ongoing campaign against "taxes on knowledge"; but the initial court decision went in their favour. The government then tried amending the existing law, to duck public opinion, reversing the stand taken by the revenue on the definition of "newspaper".

After Bradbury & Evans broke with Dickens in 1859, they founded the illustrated literary magazine Once a Week, which competed with Dickens' new All The Year Round (the successor to Household Words). Among the artists who contributed illustrations to the firm's publications: John Leech and John Tenniel. In 1861 Evans' daughter, Bessie Evans, married Dickens' son, Charles Dickens, Jr. The founders' sons, William Hardwick Bradbury (1832–1892) and Frederick Moule Evans (1832–1902), continued the business, with the much needed financial backing of William Agnew and his brother Thomas.

See also
 Sir William Agnew, 1st Baronet, a partner of the firm

References

Further reading
 
 
 
 Obituary of William Hardwick Bradbury (1832-1892), son of the firm's founder. He continued the business as Bradbury, Evans & Co., circa 1865
 
  (describes Bradbury and Evans' interaction with Charles Dickens)
  (describes Bradbury and Evans' interaction with Charles Dickens)

External links

Bradbury and Evans at Victorian Web
 Portraits of Bradbury, Evans, and sons
 Morgan Library. Letter from Dickens to F.M. Evans, 1849
 UK National Portrait Gallery. Portrait of "Frederick Evans, associate of Charles Dickens"
 Oxford University, Bodleian Library. Correspondence of Bradbury and Evans, mainly relating to Punch

English printers
Printing companies of the United Kingdom
Publishing companies of the United Kingdom
Defunct companies based in London
Publishing companies established in 1830
1830 establishments in England
19th century in London